Isidro Díaz can mean

 Isidro Díaz, Secretary of the Interior (Mexico) in 1860
 Isidro Díaz (footballer, born 1954), Spanish football forward
 Isidro Díaz (footballer, born 1972), Spanish football left midfielder